The Magnificat, WAB 24 is a setting of the Magnificat for  choir and soloists, orchestra and organ composed by Anton Bruckner in 1852.

History 
Bruckner composed the work for the Vesper service of the feast of the Assumption of Mary. He dedicated the work to Ignaz Traumihler, the choirmaster of the St. Florian Abbey.

The work was premiered on 15 August 1852 in St. Florian. Despite the fact that Traumihler was a fervent adept of the Cecilian Movement, the work remained in the repertoire of the monastery. Other performances occurred on 25 December 1852, 15 May 1854, 25 December 1854 and 27 May 1855.

The work, the manuscript of which is stored in the archive of the St. Florian Abbey, was first publish in volume II/2, pp. 99–110 of the Göllerich/Auer biography.

Setting 
The 77-bar long composition in B major is set in Allegro moderato for  choir and soloists, and orchestra (2 trumpets in B, timpani, and strings without violas). The organ supplies figured bass.

The first verse ("") is sung by the soprano soloist. The next verses are sung as an Arioso alternatingly by the soloists and the choir. The setting is followed by the doxology Gloria Patri, starting by a unison on "", the recap of the melody of the first verse on "", and concludes with a 23-bar long fugal Amen. Mean duration: 5 minutes.

The influence of Mozart is revealed through comparison to Mozart's Vespers K. 321 and K. 339.

Discography 
The first recording of Bruckner's Magnificat occurred in 1984: 
 Jürgen Jürgens, Anton Bruckner - Music of the St. Florian Period, Monteverdi-Chor and Israel Chamber Orchestra –  LP: Jerusalem Records ATD 8503 (Bruckner Archive Production), 1984. For this performance a score was specially prepared by William Carragan and David Aldeborgh. This long out-of-print LP has been transferred by John Berky to CD: BSVD-0109, 2011 
There are three other recordings of this work:
 Franz Farnberger, Anton Bruckner in St. Florian - Requiem & Motetten, St. Florianer Sängerknaben and Instrumentalensemble St. Florian – CD: Studio SM D2639 SM 44, 1997. This performance, which was recorded in the St. Florian Abbey, provides the listener with a whiff of authenticity.
 Thomas Kerbl, Anton Bruckner – Lieder | Magnificat, Chorvereinigung Bruckner 2011 and Kammerorchester der Anton Bruckner Privatuniversität Linz – CD: Bruckner Haus LIVA 046, 2011
 Łukasz Borowicz, RIAS Kammerchor, Akademie für Alte Musik Berlin, Raphael Alpermann (Organ), Anton Bruckner – Missa solemnis –  CD: Accentus ACC 30429, 2017 (Cohrs edition)

References

Sources 
 August Göllerich, Anton Bruckner. Ein Lebens- und Schaffens-Bild,  – posthumous edited by Max Auer by G. Bosse, Regensburg, 1932
 Anton Bruckner – Sämtliche Werke, Band XX/3: Magnificat (1852), Musikwissenschaftlicher Verlag der Internationalen Bruckner-Gesellschaft, Paul Hawkshaw (Editor), Vienna, 1997
 Derek Watson, Bruckner, J. M. Dent & Sons Ltd, London, 1975
 Robert Simpson, Essence of Bruckner: An essay towards the understanding of his music, Victor Gollancz Ltd, London, 1977
 Uwe Harten, Anton Bruckner. Ein Handbuch. , Salzburg, 1996. .
 John Williamson, The Cambridge Companion to Bruckner, Cambridge University Press, Cambridge, 2004
 Cornelis van Zwol, Anton Bruckner - Leven en Werken, Thot, Bussum (Netherlands), 2012 -

External links
Anton Bruckner Critical Complete Edition - Psalms and Magnificat
Magnificat B-Dur, WAB 24 Critical discography by Hans Roelofs  
 
 A life performance by the Redmond Chorale (12 July 2019) can be heard on YouTube: Magnificat - Anton Bruckner - with piano accompaniment

Compositions by Anton Bruckner
1852 compositions
Bruckner
Compositions in B-flat major